The Masters of Disaster are a team of supervillains appearing in comic books published by DC Comics. They are presented as a group of mercenaries who prefer to work for money. They are shown as metahumans with superhuman abilities. Each group member controls a superhuman ability related in some way to a force of nature: earth, wind, fire, and water.

The Masters of Disaster appeared in the second season of the live-action television series Black Lightning.

Fictional history
The Masters are portrayed as enemies of Batman's Outsiders, Infinity Inc., and the Justice Society of America. Their powers are based on the elemental forces of nature.

One of the Outsiders' earliest defeats is neutralized with the emergence of Looker. Looker defeats the Masters and frees the others.

The Masters are hired by Maxwell Tremaine to kidnap Sapphire Stagg. The Outsiders thwart this plot.

They assist Baron Bedlam and his Soviet-backed invasion of the country of Markovia which results in many soldiers dying during the invasion. The Outsiders attack an enemy camp and encounter the Masters. Learning from a previous encounter, the team defeats the Outsiders.

Windfall develops sympathetic feelings for the Outsiders and works behind the scenes to keep them alive. Windfall's defection leads to the Masters capturing and cloning her.

The Masters send Windfall's clone to infiltrate the team. Batman uncovers the ruse. The Windfall clone is then killed during battle while the real Windfall sides with the Outsiders.

New Wave, Shakedown, Coldsnap, and Heatstroke are inmates at a prison nicknamed the Slab. When Geo-Force is wrongfully arrested the Masters are inspired to plan a jailbreak. The Masters of Disaster and Geo-Force successfully escape from the Slab.

Windfall's sister New Wave does not like this. When Shakedown wants the team to work in peace, New Wave kills Shakedown, causing Windfall to leave the team.

The Masters of Disaster later gain Dust Devil and Mudslide as members when they go to steal something and end up fighting the Outsiders. When the Outsiders disagree on tactics, the Masters of Disaster get away.

In 2011, "The New 52" rebooted the DC Universe. During the "Forever Evil" storyline, Coldsnap and Shakedown are transferred to another prison with Deadshot. Heatstroke and New Wave later attack the prison transport in order to free them only to be intercepted by jet-pack wearing S.W.A.T. officers.

Coldsnap and Heatstroke later appear as members of the Suicide Squad when it comes to them assisting Katana in fighting the Kobra organization.

Members
 New Wave – Rebecca "Becky" Jones is the group leader. She can become living water. New Wave is the older sister of Windfall and is possibly insane.
 Shakedown – He is almost invulnerable and can generate powerful vibratory blasts. Shakedown tries to keep peace in the group.
 Coldsnap – Darryl is able to generate extreme cold. He is in love with Heatstroke, but cannot touch her due to his powers. Coldsnap joined the group to get money needed to cure his condition.
 Heatstroke – Joanne is able to generate extreme heat. She is in love with Coldsnap. Joanne also joined the group in order to get money needed to cure her condition.
 Windfall – Wendy Jones has air manipulation abilities. She has sympathetic feelings for Halo, which causes tension. Windfall later leaves the Masters  to join the Outsiders. She resurfaces as a member of the second iteration of Strike Force Kobra and later appears as a member of the Suicide Squad where she is killed by Chemo during a mission.
 Dust Devil – Not much is known about Dust Devil. She can fly and has air manipulation abilities.
 Mudslide – Not much is known about Mudslide. He can cause earthquakes and can liquefy objects by heating them with his hands.

In other media
 The Masters of Disaster appear in the animated DC Nation Shorts: Thunder and Lightning episode "Lightning Under the Weather".
 The Masters of Disaster appear in the Black Lightning live-action television series, with New Wave portrayed by Brooke Ence, Shakedown portrayed by Hosea Chanchez, Heatstroke portrayed by Esteban Cueto, and Coldsnap portrayed by Derrick Lewis. While New Wave and Coldsnap retain their comic book identities, Shakedown's name is Marcus Bishop and Heatstroke is a man named Joe. In the episode "The Book of Rebellion: Chapter Three: Angelitos Negros", Tobias Whale discovers the A.S.A. was developing metahumans for "Project Masters of Disaster", which involved turning violent inmates into a metahuman attack squad before they were put into stasis pods for twenty-five years. Tobias later takes the pods so he can utilize the Masters of Disaster for his purposes. In the episode "Book of Secrets: Chapter Three: Pillar of Fire", Tobias awakens Shakedown to assist him in building a metahuman army by helping his hired mercenary, Giselle Cutter, steal more pods. In the episode "The Book of the Apocalypse: Chapter One: The Alpha", Tobias, Dr. Helga Jace, and Cutter release the other Masters of Disaster to attack Freeland. Black Lightning and Thunder fight Heatstroke until Jace convinces Tobias to recall him and the other Masters of Disaster following an attack by former minion Lala. In the episode "The Book of the Apocalypse: Chapter Two: The Omega", Coldsnap freezes Freeland's power plant. While Peter Gambi and Lightning work to thaw the plant, Black Lightning and Thunder fight and defeat the Masters of Disaster while Lala shoots Heatstroke.
 A character loosely based on Windfall named Wendy Hernandez also appears in the series, portrayed by Madison Bailey. Introduced in the episode "The Book of Consequences: Chapter Two: Black Jesus Blues", this version is a teenage metahuman created by the drug Green Light 30 years prior that the ASA captured and kept in a stasis pod. After being accidentally freed from hers, she escapes and wanders Freeland in a delirious state before Black Lightning subdues her, after which she elects to return to her pod voluntarily. Though she does not take on the identity of Windfall, she retains her aerokinetic abilities and wears a pink-and-blue outfit reminiscent of her comic counterpart's costume.
 A variation of Windfall appears in Young Justice, voiced by Zehra Fazal. Introduced in the episode "Leverage", this version is a teenage, Australian resident of the Metahuman Youth Center. As of a flashback depicted in the episode "Volatile", she has joined the Outsiders.

References

External links
 Masters of Disaster at DC Comics Wiki
 Masters of Disaster at Comic Vine

1984 comics debuts
DC Comics supervillain teams
Characters created by Jim Aparo
Characters created by Mike W. Barr
Comics characters introduced in 1984